Árný Margrét Sævarsdóttir (born 2001) is an Icelandic musician. In 2021, she published her first single, Interwined. In January 2022, she debuted her second single, Akureyri. In October 2022, her first album, They Only Talk About the Weather, was published.

Early life
Árný was born and grew up in Ísafjörður, Iceland, and started learning the piano at an early age and later the guitar. Her first official performance was in 2018. In 2021, she signed with One Little Independent Records.

Discography
They Only Talk About the Weather (2022)

Singles
Interwined (2021)
Akureyri (2022)

References

Living people
21st-century women musicians
Arny Margret Saevarsdottir
Arny Margret Saevarsdottir
2001 births